The Morrison Arboretum is an arboretum located in Morrison, Oklahoma. It is open to the public daily without charge.

The arboretum's plantings include Acer truncatum, Aesculus pavia, Betula nigra, Cercis canadensis, Celtis occidentalis, Chamaecyparis nootkatensis, Fraxinus pennsylvanica, Ginkgo biloba, Ilex 'Nellie R. Stevens', Juniperus virginiana, Magnolia grandiflora, Metasequoia glyptostroboides, Morus alba 'Chaparral', Nyssa sylvatica, Platanus x acerifolia, Quercus muehlenbergii, Quercus nigra, Quercus shumardii, Taxodium distichum, and Ulmus pumila.

External links
Morrison Tree Board - Map of Morrison Arboretum, photos

See also 
 List of botanical gardens in the United States

Arboreta in Oklahoma
Botanical gardens in Oklahoma
Protected areas of Noble County, Oklahoma